MedMagLabs is an Australian company that creates wound-care treatment systems for people in humanitarian emergencies using maggot therapy.

History 
MedMagLabs was founded in 2019 at Griffith University where it was awarded government funding to create its first laboratory.

Products 

MedMagLabs builds medical maggot laboratories inside shipping containers; their "do it yourself" designs are freely available online for anyone to replicate. The laboratories are designed to be operated by non-healthcare professionals, in countries with weak healthcare systems, specifically countries experiencing armed conflict.

People 
MedMagLabs is led by Frank Stadler.

References 

Health care companies of Australia